Gautam A. Rana is an American lawyer and diplomat who has served as the United States ambassador to Slovakia since September 2022.

Early life and education
Rana earned both Bachelor of Arts and Bachelor of Science degrees from the University of Pennsylvania. He then received a Juris Doctor from the Vanderbilt University School of Law, and then a Master of Arts from the National Defense University.

Career
Rana is a career member of the Senior Foreign Service, with the rank of Counselor. He served as Deputy Chief of Mission of the U.S. Embassy in Algeria. Before this, he was the Deputy Chief of Mission and Chargé d'Affaires ad interim at the U.S. Embassy in Ljubljana, Slovenia. Rana was also focused on Afghanistan and Pakistan during his stint on the National Security Council and previously served as the Deputy Minister Counselor for Political Affairs at the U.S. Embassy in New Delhi. Rana has served in various roles within the United States Department of State, working in Iraq, Pakistan, Afghanistan, and the UAE.

United States ambassador to Slovakia
On May 25, 2022, President Joe Biden nominated Rana to be the next ambassador to Slovakia. Hearings on his nomination were held before the Senate Foreign Relations Committee on July 28, 2022. The committee favorably reported his nomination to the Senate floor on August 3, 2022. Rana was confirmed by the full Senate via voice vote on August 4, 2022. He presented his credentials to President Zuzana Čaputová on September 28, 2022.

Personal life
Rana speaks Hindi, Spanish, and Gujarati.

References

21st-century American lawyers
University of Pennsylvania alumni
Vanderbilt University Law School alumni
National Defense University alumni
United States Foreign Service personnel
Ambassadors of the United States to Slovakia